Scott Christopher Shephard (born 19/09/1979) is a British music industry executive and entrepreneur. He is the founder and CEO of So, Let's Talk and former President of Europe for American record label, Global Music Group.

Personal life
Shephard was born in Exeter, Devon, England, and is a business alumnus of Exeter College.

Career
As a music producer, consultant, manager and executive, Scott has held positions at various music companies and record labels, his expertise in the music business spans over fifteen years. Scott has worked directly with many notable recording artists and companies alike, such as Motown Records artist Val Young, American rapper Warren G, and Mack Life Records serving as Head of Online for British singer Mark Morrison.

Scott got his start in music working as a web administrator and promoter for various artists on Death Row Records, the rap label once home to Dr. Dre, Tupac Shakur and Snoop Dogg. His work included marketing releases such as the Dysfunktional Family (soundtrack), managing DBSoul.com, the official website for the labels flagship R&B artist Danny Boy, and later acting as personal publicist for artists on the label such as Danny Boy, SKG and Jewell.

In 2003, Scott was introduced to music producer DJ Slip of Comptons Most Wanted, which segued into an involvement with Los Angeles, California based record label IV Life Records and Mafia IV Life car club, founded by Ladell "Del Dog" Rowles. In addition to promoting and developing artists careers, he worked on projects with former professional basketball player Shaquille O'Neal, comedian Steve Harvey, and rapper Snoop Dogg.

Scott was appointed New Media Manager for the launch of a brand new label in 2004, Dynasty Entertainment/C.O.B. Digital owned by rapper Crooked I following his departure from Death Row Records. Responsible for the development and implementation of all digital marketing, alongside Crooked I, Scott designed and developed Dynasty TV; the first ever artist-to-fan video streaming platform that showcased music and events, before social video site YouTube existed, and WestcoastDynasty.com; a web community which distributed music including the monumental Hip-Hop Weekly series. Crooked I soon became one of the leading faces emerging from musics ‘Digital Era’ and they're innovative marketing strategies were rewarded when music publication Vibe magazine labelled him an "Internet Guerrilla" on the cover of their August 2008 issue, with an article discussing the Hip-Hop Weekly series and his approach to marketing on the internet. Crooked I mentioned Scott at the end of his song "The Finale (Week 52)", and later signed to Eminem's Shady Records as a member of the American hip hop supergroup Slaughterhouse.

Scott co-founded public relations agency 2SPR in 2006, with friend Peter Stannard. The company represented events and projects from notable clients in the entertainment and sports sectors, including Stevie Wonder, La Toya Jackson and late South African President Nelson Mandela. The company were also involved with numerous hit singles and albums on both the UK and US music charts, notably making history when George Tandy, Jr. debut single “March” reached No. 3 on Billboards Adult R&B Songs chart, being the first independent artist to ever do so on the chart.

Scott was later a consultant for former world boxing champion Chris Eubank, where he acted as PR spokesperson for the boxers well-documented court case against Rupert Murdoch's newspaper group News International.

In October 2008, Scott was appointed President of Global Music Group Europe, the Europe Division of New York-based record label, Global Music Group. The company purchased historic hip-hop label Death Row Records for $25 million on 25 June 2008.

Along with Trae Tha Truth and video director PhillyFlyBoy, Scott was the brainchild of one of the biggest urban music videos of 2012, Trae Tha Truth's I'm On 2.0. Rappers Big K.R.I.T., Jadakiss, J. Cole. Kendrick Lamar, B.o.B, Tyga, Gudda Gudda, Bun B and British R&B singer Mark Morrison all appeared on the song and in the video, along with cameos from the likes of Wiz Khalifa, Iggy Azalea, and CeeLo Green. In May 2012 MTV announced the all-star music video was MTV's Jam of the Week, the song also trended worldwide on Twitter ten minutes after it was released. In an interview with music website DopeRaps.com, video director PhillyFlyBoy explained how the song came about, saying that “after the success of “I’m On” by Trae Tha Truth, me and Trae had kind of mentioned a possible remix. Then Mark Morrison’s label guy Scott Shephard reached out with interest, and we agreed on shooting not a remix, but a 2.0”.

On June 14, 2015, Shephard was interviewed by journalist Jamey Beth of BreakawayDaily.com, on the future of the music business in the digital age. He announced that he had launched an umbrella organisation, SC923, consisting of several media brands and an award-winning music consultancy company.

In 2017, he launched FFCONNECT, a curatorial brand for playlists on Spotify. Scott was interviewed by American music industry trade publication HITS Magazine, who featured one of his playlists as 'Playlist of the Week'. Ranya Khoury, streaming manager for HITS Magazine, said “Shephard has been able to accumulate over 22k followers on Spotify alone. While browsing through his network page, his playlist Caribbean Summer Vibes immediately caught my attention. Chatting with him about this specific playlist made his keen industry insight evident”. The playlist brand was also chosen by music platform Soundplate, as 1 of 15 great electronic music curators on Spotify, “FFCONNECT is one of our favourite independent curation brands at the moment,” said Soundplate.com.

In November 2017, Scott founded his own independent boutique record label, So, Let's Talk Ltd. The labels relationship with its artists run deep, with Pras Michel of the Fugees being the first artist to sign a deal, resulting in the release of a collaboration single with Exeter-based band The Loft Club. The labels first independent release in spring 2018, a debut single by British singer Osborne, entitled "Complete (Lucky Rose Remix)" surpassed 15 million streams across platforms by spring 2019, amassing over 10 million streams on Spotify alone.

Sources and references

External links
 
 Scott Shephard at Discogs
 SC923 Website

British music industry executives
1979 births
Businesspeople from Exeter
Living people